Triangle was a post office town in 1851. The postmistress in 1861 was Anne Cross. The population in 1901 was 1,459. It had 639 people in 1956.

See also
List of communities in Newfoundland and Labrador

Populated coastal places in Canada
Populated places in Labrador